The Sereno W. Graves House is located in Rutland, Wisconsin.

History
Sereno W. Graves would become a member of the Wisconsin State Assembly. The house was listed on the National Register of Historic Places in 1982 and on the State Register of Historic Places in 1989.

Graves also designed the Samuel Hunt House and the Lockwood Barn in Rutland, which are also listed on both registers.

References

Houses on the National Register of Historic Places in Wisconsin
National Register of Historic Places in Dane County, Wisconsin
Houses in Dane County, Wisconsin
Greek Revival architecture in Wisconsin
Limestone buildings in the United States
Houses completed in 1845